"Nookie" is a song by Vincentian musician Jamesy P. The song was first released in 2002 on 7" vinyl on the VP Records sublabel Waist Line Muzik. Its 2005 release was a top 20 hit in the UK, peaking at number 14 on the UK Singles Chart. It also peaked at number 54 on the Billboard Hot R&B/Hip-Hop Songs chart. The remix version features British rapper M.I.A. and Jabba. Another version features Chrissy Mai.

Charts

References

2002 songs
2005 debut singles
Soca songs
Universal Records singles